Katharina Treutler (born in 1985 in Erfurt) is a German pianist.

Biography 
Born in Erfurt, Treutler performs in Europe, Asia and the US - solo and with orchestras such as the London Symphony Orchestra, the San Francisco Symphony Orchestra the Royal Stockholm Philharmonic Orchestra and the Tokyo Philharmonic Orchestra. She has won several international prizes. She studied in Hanover, Tokyo, Paris, Madrid, and Freiburg. Since 2016 she has been teaching at the University of Music and Theatre Leipzig. 

Her professors were Bernd Goetzke, Jacques Rouvier, Dmitri Bashkirov and Eric le Sage.

She has performed at the Concertgebouw Amsterdam, the Bunka Kaikan Hall Tokyo and the Davies Symphony Hall San Francisco.

Recordings / Publications 
 2010: Brahms Piano concerto no. 1 with the German Pediatrician’s Orchestra
 2013: Journal Frontiers in Human Neuroscience: "The influence of chronotype on making music: circadian fluctuations in pianists’ fine motor skills"
 2015: Final Symphony with the London Symphony Orchestra

References

External links
 

German pianists
German women pianists
Living people
Conservatoire de Paris alumni
Piano pedagogues
21st-century pianists
Women music educators
Women classical pianists
1985 births
21st-century women pianists